Singkawang or Sakawokng in Dayak Salako or San-Khew-Jong, is a city located in the province of West Kalimantan, on the island of Borneo in Indonesia. It is located at about 145 km north of Pontianak, the provincial capital, and is surrounded by the Pasi, Poteng, and Sakkok mountains. Singkawang is derived from the Salako languange, which refers to  a very wide area of swamps (all swamps). In addition, the ancestors of the Hakka Chinese community in Sakawokng also named this area in Hakka as "San-Khew-Jong" (Mount-Mouth-Sea), which means "A city located at the foot of a mountain near the sea and has a river that flows up to the mouth of the river (estuary)."

The city covers an area of 504 km2 and had a population of 186,462 at the 2010 Census and 235,064 at the 2020 Census; the official estimate as at mid 2021 was 237,891.

History
Originally Singkawang was a village in that part of the Sultanate of Sambas, named as Singkawang Village (Kampong Singkawang) as a haven for traders and gold miners from Monterado. The miners and traders who came mostly from China, before they headed towards Monterado, first rested in Singkawang, while gold miners from Monterado often rested in Singkawang to remove their tiredness, while Singkawang also served as the transit point for the transportation of gold dust. At that time, they called Singkawang with the word Sakawokng (Salakko Dayak language), which means a very wide swampy swamp area located on the beach. Dayak Salako are part of the soldiers and intelligence of the Sultanate of Sambas which was given territorial territory in Binua Sarauntung Sakawokng.

Basically the Salako Dayak tribe has long inhabited the Sakawokng area before it became a bustling trading area. The Hakka Chinese who came from South China, who were mostly farmers, traders, and gold miners at that time entered the Sakawokng area through small rivers in the Sado (Sedau) area.  At first, the Singkawang area was still a vast wilderness filled with swamps. Due to its geographical location, the Hakka Chinese immigrants named this area in Hakka as "San Khew Jong" (山口洋).

The word "San" (山) which means Mountain and Forest, the word "Khew" (口) which means the mouth of the river, and the word "Jong" (洋) which means the sea. These three syllables really describe the geographical location of Singkawang which is surrounded by mountains and adjacent to the sea and has a river that flows from upstream to downstream and empties into the mouth of the river (estuary). Coincidentally or not, the name San Khew Jong given by the Hakka Chinese immigrants has the same sound and meaning as the name Sakawokng, which was first named by the Salako Dayak ancestors.  This shows that there has been a well-established interaction since time immemorial between the Chinese Hakka community and the indigenous Dayak Salako Sakawokng, especially in terms of language and culture.

Administrative districts
The city is divided into five administrative districts (kecamatan), listed below with their areas and their populations at the 2010 Census and the 2020 Census, together with the official estimates as at mid 2021.

Climate
Singkawang has a tropical rainforest climate (Af) with heavy to very heavy rainfall year-round.

Demographics

Most of the population are of Chinese descent (around 42% of whole population). The largest group of Chinese descent is Hakka people (locally called as "Hakka-nyin" who speak Guangdong-Hakka dialect). The other major group of Chinese descent is Chaozhou People which is better known as Teochew. The rest are Malay, Dayak, Javanese, and other ethnicities. The total population was 235,064 at the 2020 Census.

The distribution of the religion practically follows the distribution of the ethnic groups; the largest groups are Islam followed by Buddhism, Catholic, Protestant and Confucianism.

City of Tolerance

Singkawang is also known as the City of tolerance. The city of Singkawang gets the title of the most tolerant city in Indonesia, because it is seen from a socio-cultural perspective. there is a uniqueness and togetherness of cultural diversity and the culture of the people who live and settle in Singkawang City, uphold the values of Pancasila and uphold the unity of the Unitary State of the Republic of Indonesia.

Food Autenthic Culinary
Chinese food especially Hakka style dominates the food stalls or small restaurants, but Teochew style is also available. Minang style food can also be found here. Unique food like Rujak Ju Hie (鱿鱼炒; rojak with dried squid) is one of delicacies in Singkawang. Tofu (bean curd) Singkawang is famous in West Kalimantan, also Kembang Tahu (腐皮; silky smooth tofu with sugar gravy) is very popular in this city. Singkawang is also famous for its cakes. The variety of cakes is surprising and available from early morning till midnight. Choi Pan (菜粄:Steamed vegetable dumplings) is one of the many special traditional Chinese delicacies. Believed to be of Hakka origin, it consists mainly of fragrantly stir-fried yam bean wrapped in a slightly chewy translucent skin and is steamed to perfection. There are also have several Malay food such as Bubur Paddas (Malay's spicy porridge), Pedak (fermented shrimp paste) and Nasi Lemak. Kopi tiam (咖啡店; local coffee shop) with strong bitter robusta coffee can be found every where. Peaceful and safe feeling for everyone makes Singkawang to be one of the cities with lively night. One may enjoy various food in Pasar Hongkong from porridge, kwetiau, fried rice, nasi lemak, rujak (fruit & vegetables salad), cakes coffee stall. And the prices of the food are surprisingly cheap. Local people enjoy the night with their friends discussing the local hottest issues, singing, or playing cards.

Chinatown
Besides being well known as the City of Thousands Temples, as there are many small and large temples in any part of the Singkawang region, Singkawang is also known as one of the Indonesian Chinatowns since the majority of the population is of Chinese descent, consisting of mostly Hakka and some other sub-group of Han Chinese. Theye reside in all areas in the city. They still practice their culture in any ceremony or official events, from weddings to funeral ceremonies. The culture is seen as the closest to the original tradition of Chinese people (mostly refers to Hakka), making Singkawang known as the Indonesian Chinatown.

Languages
Singkawang people use Indonesian as the primary language not only in conversation or trading, but they also use their own mother tongue. As Singkawang consists of three major ethnic groups, Chinese, Malays and Dayak, Hakka people, almost all of the Singkawang people use either Indonesian or Hakka Chinese for conversation; even some members of other ethnic groups use it, too. The Indonesian used in Singkawang commonly for daily conversation is not standard Indonesian, but has some Malay influence on vocabulary as Malay is the closest language to Indonesian and the Singkawang people have for years been accustomed to Malay.

Transportation
At present there is no airport at Singkawang, and served by Supadio International Airport. It is connected by road, can be reached by bus or taxi from Pontianak covering a distance of 150 km. It is also connected by road to Kuching in Malaysia via the Aruk/Biawak border and Sambas. A toll road to Pontianak is under consideration.

A new international airport, which will serve Singkawang and become an alternative for Pontianak airport, is under construction. It will be built in two phases, out of which the first phase is expected to be completed by the end of 2024.

Festivals

 Cap Go Meh (正月半 Jang Ngiet Ban in Hakka) is celebrated on the 15th and last day of Chinese New Year, the main spotlight of the day is Tatung (大同) festival, a mixed Chinese and Dayak people rituals;
 Qingming Festival or locally known as Cheng Beng, celebrated on 4–5 April in a given year;
 May: Gawai Dayak Naik Dango is celebrated by the Dayak in the opening of the rice harvest to thank the Gods;
 June 1: Ngabayotn is celebrated by the Dayak people to celebrate the closing form of rice harvest and beginning of the cultivation season;
 August: Wayang Gantung;
 August 17: The Celebration of Indonesian Independence day;
 October: Singkawang 10 km running contest is held on Singkawang's anniversary;
 October: Dragon Cup soccer championship gathers the clubs from the surrounding districts to celebrate Singkawang's anniversary;
 October: Pawai Takbir;
 Festival Bedug on Idul Adha day;
 Karnaval Muharram celebrates Islamic new year

Around Singkawang

Places of interest around the city are:
 Villa Bukit Mas, a resort;
 Bukit Bougenville, a botanical garden about 6 km south of Singkawang;
 Chidayu Indah, is a similar garden to that of Bougenville, and lies right next to it;
 Pasir Panjang (长沙海滩) beach resort about 17 km south of Singkawang;
 Sungai Hangmoy (坑門), a river used for bathing mainly by the Hakka population;
 Kawasan Wisata, a white sanded beach 8 km south of Singkawang;
 Teratai Indah, an artificial lake used for recreation by the locals; lies only 2 km south of Singkawang;
 Thai Pak Kung Temple (大伯公廟)
 Vihara Chikung (济公庙), the largest Taoist temple in the area, funded by Singaporeans, located 3 km south of the city;
 Gunung Roban, a mount with a tiled path up the mountain used by the locals for easy hiking; located 4 km to the east.
 Batu Belimbing, or Starfruit Rock, a rock that resembles a starfruit. lies 8 km east of the city;
 Gunung Poteng is one of the main water resources for the city, and lies 7 km east. The mountain is a Natural Reserve where unique flora such as the Rafflesia Tuan Mudae grows;
 Sinka Island Park location at south of Singkawang in Teluk Karang has access to small Simping Island, recreational park, swimming pool and mini zoo around a hill.

Mail Order Bride Scandal
There have been unsubstantiated allegations of human trafficking in Singkawang, based upon the town's mail order bride illegal business. Most of the men who travel to Singkawang looking for young women to marry are from Taiwan, Mainland China, or Singapore. These men arrive and get in touch with brokers, these brokers then approach families with suitably aged daughters and generally offers these parents about 6 million rupiahs (about US$450) for each girl.

It is most normal for a majority of these foreign clients to pay an amount exceedingly more than what is requested by the brokers and most payments are at an average of 30 million rupiahs (about US$2,250). Contracts are often drawn between the brokers and the clients. It is a fact that each contract includes a time period clause and most of these marriages are contractually bound for 2 to 4 years, some for even shorter periods of time. It is also common for these relationships to not be legally bound marriages.

Indonesian police actively arrest the offender of mail order bride.

Sister cities
  Bintulu, Sarawak, Malaysia
  Kuching, Sarawak, Malaysia
  Miri, Sarawak, Malaysia
  Sibu, Sarawak, Malaysia
 Kangar, Perlis, Malaysia
  Singapore, Singapore
  Fuzhou, PRC
  Gutian County, PRC
  Minjiang, PRC
  Matsu, Taiwan
  Yangmei District, Taiwan
  Newcastle upon Tyne, England
  Yamaguchi, Japan
  Pamplona, Spain

Notable people
 Morgan Oey, actor and singer, former member of Indonesian idol group SMASH
 Christiandy Sanjaya (黃漢山), Deputy Governor of West Kalimantan

References

External links

  Official Singkawang Website

 
Populated places in West Kalimantan